The 2020 Giro d'Italia was the 103rd edition of the Giro d'Italia, one of cycling's Grand Tours. The Giro began in Monreale with an individual time trial on 3 October, and Stage 12 occurred on 15 October with a stage from Cesenatico. The race finished in Milano on 25 October.

Classification standings

Stage 12
15 October 2020 - Cesenatico to Cesenatico,

Stage 13
16 October 2020 - Cervia to Monselice,

Stage 14
17 October 2020 - Conegliano to Valdobbiadene,  (ITT)

Stage 15
18 October 2020 - Base Aerea Rivolto to Piancavallo,

Rest day 2
19 October 2020

Stage 16
20 October 2020 - Udine to San Daniele del Friuli,

Stage 17
21 October 2020 - Bassano del Grappa to Madonna di Campiglio,

Stage 18
22 October 2020 - Pinzolo to Laghi di Cancano,

Stage 19
23 October 2020 - Morbegno Abbiategrasso to Asti,

Stage 20
24 October 2020 - Alba to Sestriere,

Stage 21
25 October 2020 - Cernusco sul Naviglio to Milano,  (ITT)

References

2020 Giro d'Italia
Giro d'Italia stages